Hermann Friedrich Oskar Kaul (11 October 1885 – 17 July 1968) was a German musicologist and professor at the University of Würzburg.

Life 
Kaul was born in 1885 as the son of the chemist Alexander Kaul (1845-1913) and Clara Hoffmanns (b. 1855) in Upper Bavaria, Bruckmühl community. After elementary school he attended a Humanistisches Gymnasium in Cologne, then in 1905 he went to study music at the Hochschule für Musik und Tanz Köln there. Among others, he was student of Max van de Sandt, Lazzaro Uzielli, Fritz Steinbach, Ewald Straeßer and Waldemar von Baußnern. At the same time he studied German literature and philosophy at the University of Bonn. In 1908 he moved to the Hochschule für Musik und Theater München and studied musicology among others with Adolf Sandberger and Theodor Kroyer. Kaul obtained his doctorate there in 1911 with a dissertation on The vocal works of Antonio Rosetti. A one-year teaching position at the Krefeld Conservatory was followed in 1912 by a call to the Hochschule für Musik Würzburg. Ten years later he was habilitated with a thesis on the History of the Würzburger Hofmusik im 18 Jahrhundert. In the summer he finally gave lectures - for the first time in the history of the Würzburg Music School - on historical musicology. Kaul strove to expand musicology and achieved this goal: in 1928 he was appointed extraordinary professor. In the Third Reich the topic became more important for ideological reasons. In 1941, at Kaul's insistence, a regular musicological seminar was approved and established by the Reich Ministry of Science, Education and Culture in Würzburg for the first Academic quarter; he himself was appointed to the seminar board. During the Second World War Kaul left the university.

On 17 July 1968 Kaul died at the age of 82 in Unterwössen, Upper Bavaria.

Publications 
 1980: Musica Herbipolensis. Aus Würzburgs musikalischer Vergangenheit. Publisher: Frohmut Dangel-Hofmann. Gress, Marktbreit, .
 1968: Thematisches Verzeichnis der Instrumentalwerke von Anton Rosetti. Breitkopf & Härtel, Wiesbaden.
 1935: Zur Musikgeschichte der ehemaligen Reichsstadt Schweinfurt. Becker, Würzburg.
 1925: Von deutscher Tonkunst. Eine Auslese aus dem musikalischen Schrifttum. R. Oldenbourg, Munich, .
 1924: Geschichte der Würzburger Hofmusik im 18.Jahrhundert. C.F. Becker, Würzburg,  (habilitation text).
 1911: Die Vokalwerke Anton Rosettis. Greven & Bechtold (Dissertation).

References

External links 
 
 Kaul, Oskar on 

1885 births
1968 deaths
People from Rosenheim
20th-century German musicologists
German music historians
Academic staff of the Hochschule für Musik Würzburg